The Gang That Sold America is a 1979 Italian "poliziottesco"-comedy film directed by Bruno Corbucci. It is the fifth chapter in the Nico Giraldi film series starred by Tomas Milian. The Italian progressive rock band Goblin created the soundtrack for the film.

Cast
 Tomas Milian: Nico Giraldi
 Enzo Cannavale: Salvatore Esposito
 Asha Puthli: Fiona Strike
Leo Gavero : Don Vito
 Isa Danieli: Salvatore Esposito's wife
 Margherita Fumero: Maria Sole Giarra
 Gianni Musy: Gitto Cardone
 Tomas Milian, Jr.: Antonio, Salvatore Esposito's child
 Andrea Aureli: Don Mimì
Irwin Keyes : support killer

Release
The Gang that Sold America was released on March 1, 1979 where it was distributed by Titanus. It grossed a total of 569 million Italian lire.

See also 
 List of Italian films of 1979

Notes

References

External links

1979 films
1970s crime comedy films
1970s Italian-language films
Films set in Rome
Films set in New York (state)
Poliziotteschi films
Films directed by Bruno Corbucci
Films scored by Goblin (band)
Titanus films
Italian crime comedy films
1979 comedy films
1970s Italian films